Chilimny is a rural locality (a settlement) in Kilinchinsky Selsoviet, Privolzhsky District, Astrakhan Oblast, Russia. The population was 46 as of 2010. There is 1 street.

Geography 
Chilimny is located 32 km south of Nachalovo (the district's administrative centre) by road. Vesyolaya Griva is the nearest rural locality.

References 

Rural localities in Privolzhsky District, Astrakhan Oblast